Arkadiusz Szczygieł (born 21 February 1975) is a retired Polish football striker.

References

1975 births
Living people
Polish footballers
GKS Katowice players
Rozwój Katowice players
Śląsk Świętochłowice players
Ruch Radzionków players
Association football forwards